Melanogaster aerosa is a Palearctic hoverfly

Taxonomy
This species appears in recent literature as well as older literature under the name Chrysogaster macquarti.

Description
External images
For terms see Morphology of Diptera
Males: The margin of mouth and apex of the median tubercle of face almost in the same vertical plane. Females: mesonotum with short but dense hairs; abdomen on upper side in middle part matt black. Body length 6.0 to 7.0.mm.

Habitat
Wetlands including flushes, pools and small streams in moorland.

Biology
Flies among waterside vegetation from May to September,. Flowers visited include 
Cirsium, Hieracium, Leontodon.

References

Diptera of Europe
Eristalinae
Insects described in 1843
Taxa named by Hermann Loew